Thutmose (also rendered Thutmoses, Thutmosis, Tuthmose, Tutmosis, Thothmes, Tuthmosis, Thutmes, Djhutmose, Djehutymes, etc.) is an Anglicization of the Ancient Egyptian personal name dhwty-ms, usually translated as "Born of the god Thoth".

Thoutmôsis (in Ancient Greek Θούθμωσις / Thoúthmôsis ) is the Hellenized form of the Egyptian Ḏḥwtj-mś (reconstructed pronunciation: /tʼaˈħawtij ˈmissaw/) and means "Born of Thoth  ". This theophoric name was part of the royal titulary of four pharaohs of the 18th dynasty as the  name of Sa-Rê or “birth name”. It was also worn by the eldest son of Amenhotep III, high priest of Ptah, as well as by a vizier who exercised his functions successively under Thutmose IV and Amenhotep III. Under this last king and under his successor, Amenhotep IV, two other high dignitaries, royal sons of Kush, similarly called themselves "Born[s] of Thoth"

Ancient Egyptians

Monarchs and royals
The name was common among royals of the Eighteenth Dynasty, which is thus sometimes called the "Thutmosid" Dynasty from the reign of Thutmose I onward.

Thutmose I (16th-century–c. 1490 BC), third pharaoh of the Eighteenth Dynasty
Thutmose II (fl. 1493–1479 BC), fourth pharaoh
Thutmose III (fl. 1479–1425 BC), "the Conqueror" or "the Great", sixth pharaoh
Thutmose IV (died 14th-century BC), eighth pharaoh
Crown Prince Thutmose, the elder brother of Pharaoh Akhenaten

Royal officials
 Thutmose (18th-dynasty vizier), Vizier during the reign of Thutmose IV
 Thutmose (19th-dynasty vizier), Vizier during the latter part of the reign of Ramesses II during the 19th dynasty
 Tuthmose (Viceroy of Kush), the Viceroy of Kush during the reign of Akhenaten

Other Egyptians
 Thutmose (sculptor) (fl. 1350 BC), Akhenaten's court sculptor at Amarna, to whom is attributed the famous Berlin bust of Nefertiti

Others
 Thutmose (musician) (born 1995), stage name of the Nigerian-American rapper Umar Ibrahim

Theophoric names